Thomas Scott (born January 9, 1990) is an American karateka. He won one of the bronze medals in the men's 75 kg event at the 2021 World Karate Championships held in Dubai, United Arab Emirates. He is also a two-time gold medalist in the men's 75kg event at the Pan American Games, both in 2015 and in 2019. He won the silver medal in this event at the 2011 Pan American Games.

He represented the United States at the 2020 Summer Olympics in Tokyo, Japan. He competed in the men's 75 kg event, where he did not advance to compete in the semifinals.

Career 

In 2017, he lost his bronze medal match in the men's kumite 75 kg event at the World Games held in Wrocław, Poland.

In June 2021, he competed at the World Olympic Qualification Tournament held in Paris, France, hoping to qualify for the 2020 Summer Olympics in Tokyo, Japan, and he did not qualify at this tournament, but he was able to qualify via reallocation of a vacant spot in the Male Kumite – 75kg category. In August, he competed in the men's 75 kg event at the Olympics. In November, he won one of the bronze medals in the men's 75 kg event at the 2021 World Karate Championships held in Dubai, United Arab Emirates. In his bronze medal match he defeated Eren Akkurt of Turkey.

He lost his bronze medal match in the men's kumite 75 kg event at the 2022 World Games held in Birmingham, United States.

Achievements

References

External links 

 

Living people
1990 births
People from Richardson, Texas
American male karateka
Pan American Games medalists in karate
Pan American Games gold medalists for the United States
Pan American Games silver medalists for the United States
Karateka at the 2011 Pan American Games
Karateka at the 2015 Pan American Games
Karateka at the 2019 Pan American Games
Medalists at the 2011 Pan American Games
Medalists at the 2015 Pan American Games
Medalists at the 2019 Pan American Games
Karateka at the 2020 Summer Olympics
Olympic karateka of the United States
Competitors at the 2022 World Games
21st-century American people